The current Constitution of Bolivia (literally, the Political Constitution of the State) came into effect on 7 February 2009 when it was promulgated by President Evo Morales, after being approved in a referendum with 90.24% participation. The referendum was held on 25 January 2009, with the constitution being approved by 61.43% of voters.

It is the 17th constitution in the country's history; previous constitutions were enacted in 1826, 1831, 1834, 1839, 1843, 1851, 1861, 1868, 1871, 1878, 1880, 1938, 1945, 1947, 1961, and 1967.

The 2009 Constitution defines Bolivia as a unitary plurinational, and secular (rather than a Catholic, as before) state, formally known as the Plurinational State of Bolivia. It calls for a mixed economy of state, private, and communal ownership; restricts private land ownership to a maximum of 5,000 hectares (12,400 acres); and recognizes a variety of autonomies at the local and departmental level. It elevates the electoral authorities to become a fourth constitutional power; introduces the possibility of recall elections for all elected officials; and enlarges the Senate. Members of the enlarged National Congress will be elected by first past the post voting in the future, in a change from the previous mixed member proportional system. The judiciary is reformed, and judges will be elected in the future and no longer appointed by the National Congress. It declares natural resources to be the exclusive dominion of the Bolivian people, administered by the state. Sucre will be acknowledged as Bolivia's capital, but the institutions will remain where they are (executive and legislative in La Paz, judiciary in Sucre). The electoral authorities will be situated in Sucre.

Drafting process
The Bolivian Gas War preceded the drafting process. The Gas War centered on the controversial decision of the National Revolutionary Movement (MNR) party to export Bolivian natural gas through Chilean ports which had been taken by Chile in the Pacific War of the 1870s. The Gas War came to a head in October 2003 with violent protest throughout the country from various social actors, leaving at least 70 dead. The then President Gonzalo Sánchez de Lozada ('Goni') resigned and fled to the US. Goni was succeeded by Vice President Carlos Mesa who was forced to step down amid further widespread protest in El Alto, La Paz and Cochabamba in June 2005. This led to the selection of judge Eduardo Rodríguez as head of a caretaker government which provided setting for new elections in December 2005. A number of new parties stepped into the political frame.

Evo Morales' MAS party was elected and began implementing its 'October Agenda', a set of social movement demands stemming from The Gas War. The first of these tasks was to initiate a Constitutional Assembly to write a new constitution. The assembly comprised elected representatives from every region of the country. The Assembly failed to reach common agreement over various issues, including the rules of operation. Eventually, having failed to reach an agreement in Sucre - often amid violent protest or else stalemate - the MAS party were forced to retreat to Oruro to finalise the Constitution. The constitution was therefore further modified by an Editing Commission before, with much fanfare, Evo presided over the passage of the new Constitution on 14 December 2007.

Because nationally and internationally this process was not considered democratic by some, the constitution was not at the time considered legitimate, though it provided some political stability to Bolivia. Therefore, there was an ongoing process of renegotiation: this included dialogue in Cochabamba between the President and opposition Prefects in September 2008; and in Congress during negotiations for a referendum in October 2008.

Text and provisions of the 2009 Constitution

Organization 
The text of the constitution is divided in five broad parts:
 Part One: Fundamental Bases of the State, Rights, Obligations, and Guarantees
 Part Two: Functional Structure and Organization of the State
 Part Three: Territorial Structure and Organization of the State
 Part Four: Economic Structure and Organization of the State
 Part Five: Hierarchy of Norms and Reform of the Constitution

Each part is divided into titles, and these titles into chapters. Some chapters are themselves divided into sections. Altogether the constitution has 411 articles.

State and democracy
Bolivia is established by the current constitution as a plural and unitary state:

The Constitution (in Chapter Three of Title I) defines the forms of democracy—participatory, representative and community-based—and structure of government to be used in Bolivia. Direct and participatory democracy takes place through referendums, citizen legislative initiatives, revocation of elected officials' mandates, assemblies, cabildos and prior consultation. Representative democracy takes place through the election of representatives through universal, direct, and secret vote. Communal democracy takes place through the "election, designation or nomination of authorities and representatives" among indigenous, originary, or campesino peoples and nations, using their own norms and procedures. The same chapter establishes a separation of powers between four branches of government: legislative, executive, judicial, and electoral.

Bolivia also becomes a "pacifist state" that rejects war, although it reserves a right to "legitimate defense." The Constitution prohibits the installation of foreign military bases within the country.

The Constitution is established as the supreme law of the Bolivian state, and 36 indigenous languages as well as Spanish are declared official languages. All departmental governments must use, as official languages, one indigenous language in addition to Spanish.

The Constitution assigns the role of national capital to Sucre, not referring to La Paz in the text. Nonetheless the Palacio Quemado (the Presidential Palace and seat of Bolivian executive power) is located in La Paz, as are the National Congress and Plurinational Electoral Organ. La Paz thus continues to be the seat of government and de facto administrative capital.

Electoral system
The electoral authorities, which will become a fourth constitutional power, will be situated in Sucre.

Following the Constitution's enactment, new elections to all public bodies are to be held, and all previous terms will not be considered for term limits. Additionally, the President will be allowed to be re-elected once, thus allowing Evo Morales two more terms if he decides to pursue this route. Furthermore, if no candidate gains more than 50% of the vote in the presidential election, there will be a second round; up to now, the National Congress decided who would become president in such a case.

Atacama corridor

The 2009 Constitution of Bolivia states that the country has an unrenounceable right over the territory that gives it access to the Pacific Ocean and its maritime space. This is understood as Chilean territory that Bolivia ceded in Treaty of Peace and Friendship of 1904 between Chile and Bolivia after the War of the Pacific which left Bolivia a landlocked country. The text also pledges to achieve resolution to the issue "through peaceful means."

The constitution states the following:

Coca 

One important change in the new constitution is the introduction of an article concerning coca. The article states:

Transition and implementation
The 2009 Constitution is accompanied by a transitional law. In order for the various bodies of government created under the Constitution to function a set of five structural laws were needed, and a deadline of 180 days following the enactment of the Constitution was set for these laws to be passed. They are:
 The Electoral Organs Law
 The Judicial Organs Law
 The Framework Law on Autonomies
 The Electoral Regime Law
 The Constitutional Court Law
An analysis by Minister of Autonomy Carlos Romero estimates that at least 106 laws must be approved to fully implement the new constitution. , sixteen such laws had been passed. The head of the MAS-IPSP delegation in the Chamber of Deputies has pledged to prioritize 40 further "necessary" laws in 2011 sessions.

Changed institutions
The 2009 Constitution replaces or renames a wide variety of institutions. This following table is a summary of such changes.

Past constitutions

Bolivia has had seventeen constitutions, including the present one, since its foundation in 1825. ts previous constitutions were enacted in 1826, 1831, 1834, 1839, 1843, 1851, 1861, 1868, 1871, 1878, 1880, 1938, 1945, 1947, 1961 and 1967.

See also
 Bolivian constitutional referendum, 2009
 Bolivian constitutional referendum, 2016
 Constitution
 Constitutional law
 Constitutional economics
 Constitutionalism

References

External links
 Text of the 2009 Constitution (PDF) 
 English translation of 2009 Constitution (PDF)
 Miradas. Nuevo Texto Constitucional (A Closer Look: Bolivia's New Constitution) IDEA, Vice Presidency of Bolivia, Universidad Mayor de San Andrés, 2010.  

 
Law of Bolivia
Government of Bolivia